Alaeddin Boroujerdi (born 1950) is a member of Iranian parliament and former Chairman for the Committee for Foreign Policy and National Security of the Islamic Consultative Assembly of Iran.

Overview
In October 2011, he was arrested for embezzlement but was released after 24 hours thanks to mediation from Ali Larijani. He denied corruption charges. However, he has been pressured to resign because of the controversy.

In November 2011, he asked that the British Ambassador to Iran, Dominick John Chilcott, be sent back to the United Kingdom.

He is a supporter of the Supreme Leader Ayatollah Khamenei and in 2011 accused Esfandiar Rahim Mashai, Mahmoud Ahmadinejad's chief of staff, of leading a "deviant current" against the regime.

References

Living people
Members of the 6th Islamic Consultative Assembly
Members of the 7th Islamic Consultative Assembly
Members of the 8th Islamic Consultative Assembly
Followers of Wilayat fraction members
Ambassadors of Iran to China
Members of the 9th Islamic Consultative Assembly
Members of the 10th Islamic Consultative Assembly
1950 births